Fenton George Coles (born 14 September 1937) was a Welsh rugby union player. A wing, Coles played club rugby initially for his home town club of Blaenavon before switching to Pontypool RFC. In 1960 he was part of a joint Cross Keys/Pontypool team to face a touring South Africa team and that year saw Coles selected for Wales playing three games in the 1960 Five Nations Championship. During the 1964–65 season he was made captain of the Pontypool first team.

Notes

1937 births
Living people
Blaenavon RFC players
Monmouthshire County RFC players
Pontypridd RFC players
Rugby union players from Blaenavon
Rugby union wings
Wales international rugby union players
Welsh rugby union players